Alsigarh is a village in Jhadol Tehsil in Udaipur district in the Indian state of Rajasthan. It is located on hilly area above 540 meters above the sea level.

References

Villages in Udaipur district